Portsmouth railway station was on the Copy Pit line and served the village of Portsmouth, which was part of Lancashire, before being incorporated into the West Riding of Yorkshire in the late 1880s. It is now in the successor county of West Yorkshire.  It opened along with the line in 1849 but was closed as an economy measure on 7 July 1958. Few traces of the station remain, although the line itself remains in use for passenger trains between Burnley and Hebden Bridge or Todmorden.

References

External links
 Portsmouth station on navigable 1947 O. S. map
Railscot - Photos of Portsmouth (Lancashire)

Disused railway stations in Calderdale
Former Lancashire and Yorkshire Railway stations
Railway stations in Great Britain opened in 1849
Railway stations in Great Britain closed in 1958
Todmorden
1849 establishments in England